Cambodia used the postage stamps of Indochina until the early 1950s. In 1949 Cambodia became an associated state of the French Union but gained independence in 1953 and left the Union in 1955.

First stamps 
The first stamps were issued in 1951 for the kingdom of Cambodia, Royaume du Cambodge, as a self-governing state within the French Union. One of the stamps depicted King Norodom Sihanouk. Cambodia gained independence on 9 November 1953.

Khmer Republic 
The Khmer Republic was declared on 9 October 1970. Stamps inscribed Republique Khmere were issued from 1971 to 1975.

Democratic Kampuchea 
The National United Front of Kampuchea took over Cambodia in 1975 and established Democratic Kampuchea. The new regime allowed no civilian private communication and so abolished the postal system.
  
Service resumed in early 1979 when the Vietnam People's Army drove the Khmer Rouge out of the capital Phnom Penh.

People's Republic of Kampuchea 
April 1980 saw the first set of postage stamps issued after the establishment of the People's Republic of Kampuchea. In 1989, the name of "People's Republic of Kampuchea" was changed to the State of Cambodia.

Following the 1991 Paris Peace Accords, Cambodia was governed briefly by a United Nations mission  from 1992–93.

Kingdom of Cambodia 
In 1993, the Kingdom of Cambodia was restored as a constitutional monarchy.

See also 
 Postage stamps and postal history of Indochina

References

External links
http://cambodiaphilately.blogspot.com/ Cambodia Philately
http://www.sicp-online.org/ Society of Indo-China Philatelists
The Post Offices of Phnom Penh.

Philately of Cambodia